Walter Woodworth White (December 14, 1862 – July 10, 1952) was a Canadian politician. He served in the Legislative Assembly of New Brunswick as member of the Conservative party representing Saint John City from 1931 to 1935.

References

1862 births
1952 deaths
20th-century Canadian politicians
Politicians from Saint John, New Brunswick
Progressive Conservative Party of New Brunswick MLAs